In mathematics, the injective tensor product of two topological vector spaces (TVSs) was introduced by Alexander Grothendieck and was used by him to define nuclear spaces. Injective tensor products have applications outside of nuclear spaces. In particular, as described below, up to TVS-isomorphism, many TVSs that are defined for real or complex valued functions, for instance, the Schwartz space or the space of continuously differentiable functions, can be immediately extended to functions valued in a Hausdorff locally convex TVS  with any need to extend definitions (such as "differentiable at a point") from real/complex-valued functions to -valued functions.

Preliminaries and notation
Throughout let  and  be topological vector spaces and  be a linear map.

 If  is a subspace of  then both the quotient map  and the canonical injection  are homomorphisms. In particular, any linear map  can be canonically decomposed as follows:  where  defines a bijection. 
 The set of separately continuous bilinear maps  (that is, continuous in each variable when the other variable is fixed) will be denoted by  where if  is the scalar field then we may instead write  

Notation for topologies

 As usual, if  is considered as a topological vector space but it has not been made clear what topology it is endowed with, then the topology will be assumed to be  
 Note that  
 If  is a set of linear mappings  then  is equicontinuous if and only if it is equicontinuous at the origin; that is, if and only if for every neighborhood  of the origin in  there exists a neighborhood  of the origin in  such that  for every 

Definition

Continuous bilinear maps as a tensor product

For every  we now define a bilinear form, denoted by the symbol  from  into the underlying field (that is) by 
 
This induces a canonical map 
 
defined by sending  to the bilinear form  
The span of the range of this map is  

Topology

Henceforth, all topological vector spaces considered will be assumed to be locally convex. 

Every set  is bounded, which is necessary and sufficient for the collection of all such  to form a locally convex TVS topology on  called the -topology. 
The inclusions
 
always hold and whenever any one of these vector spaces is endowed with the -topology then this will be indicated by placing  as a subscript before the opening parenthesis. For example,  endowed with the -topology will be denoted by 

Equicontinuous sets

One reason for converging on equicontinuous subsets (of all possibilities) is the following important fact:

A TVS's topology is completely determined by the open neighborhoods of the origin. This fact together with the bipolar theorem means that via the operation of taking the polar of a subset, the collection of all equicontinuous subsets of  "encodes" all information about 's given topology. Specifically, distinct LCTVS topologies on  produce distinct collections of equicontinuous subsets and conversely, given any such collection of equicontinuous sets, the TVS's original topology can be recovered by taking the polar of every (equicontinuous) set in the collection.
Furthermore, the topology of a locally convex Hausdorff space  is identical to the topology of uniform convergence on the equicontinuous subsets of 

For this reason, the article now lists some properties of equicontinuous sets that are relevant for dealing with the injective tensor product.

the topology of precompact convergence;
the topology of compact convergence;
the topology of pointwise convergence;
the topology of pointwise convergence on a given dense subset of 
 An equicontinuous set  is bounded in the topology of bounded convergence (that is, bounded in ). So in particular,  will also bounded in every TVS topology that is coarser than the topology of bounded convergence. 
 is equicontinuous;
 is bounded in the topology of pointwise convergence (that is, bounded in );
 is bounded in the topology of bounded convergence (that is, bounded in ).
In particular, to show that a set  is equicontinuous it suffices to show that it is bounded in the topology of pointwise converge. 

For equicontinuous subsets of the continuous dual space  (where  is now the underlying scalar field of ), the following hold: 
 If  is a normable space then a subset  is equicontinuous if and only if it is strongly bounded (that is, bounded in ).
 If  is a barrelled space then for any subset  the following are equivalent: 
 is equicontinuous;
 is relatively compact in the weak dual topology;
 is weakly bounded;
 is strongly bounded.

We mention some additional important basic properties relevant to the injective tensor product: 
If  is separately continuous then it is continuous.

Canonical identification of separately continuous bilinear maps with linear maps

The set equality  always holds; that is, if  is a linear map, then  is continuous if and only if  is continuous, where here  has its original topology.

There also exists a canonical vector space isomorphism

 

When  is given the topology of uniform convergence on equicontinous subsets of  the canonical map becomes a TVS-isomorphism 

The inclusion  always holds.

Properties

The canonical map  is always continuous and the ε-topology is always finer than the π-topology and coarser than the inductive topology (which is the finest locally convex TVS topology making  separately continuous). 

 If all four spaces are normed then

Relation to projective tensor product and nuclear spaces

The strongest locally convex topology on  making the canonical map  (defined by sending  to the bilinear form ) continuous is called the projective topology or the -topology.

The following definition was used by Grothendieck to define nuclear spaces.

Definition 0: Let  be a locally convex topological vector space. Then  is nuclear if for any locally convex space  the canonical vector space embedding  is an embedding of TVSs whose image is dense in the codomain.

Canonical identifications of bilinear and linear maps
In this section we describe canonical identifications between spaces of bilinear and linear maps. These identifications will be used to define important subspaces and topologies (particularly those that relate to nuclear operators and nuclear spaces).

Dual spaces of the injective tensor product and its completion
Suppose that 
 
denotes the TVS-embedding of  into its completion and let 
 
be its transpose, which is a vector space-isomorphism.

The identity map 
 
is continuous (by definition of the π-topology) so there exists a unique continuous linear extension 

Injective tensor product of Hilbert spaces

There is a canonical map 
 
that sends  to the linear map  defined by 
 
where it may be shown that the definition of  does not depend on the particular choice of representation  of  The map 
 
is continuous and when  is complete, it has a continuous extension

Integral forms and operators

Integral bilinear forms

Denote the identity map by 
 
and let 
 
denote its transpose, which is a continuous injection.

Integral linear operators

 
A continuous map  is called integral if its associated bilinear form is an integral bilinear form. An integral map  is of the form, for every  and 

Canonical map into L(X; Y)

There is a canonical map  that sends  to the linear map  defined by  where it may be shown that the definition of  does not depend on the particular choice of representation  of

Examples

Space of summable families

Throughout this section we fix some arbitrary (possibly uncountable) set  a TVS  and we let  be the directed set of all finite subsets of  directed by inclusion 

The set of all such summable families is a vector subspace of  denoted by 

This is a common occurrence when studying the injective and projective tensor products of function/sequence spaces and TVSs: the "natural way" in which one would define (from scratch) a topology on such a tensor product is frequently equivalent to the injective or projective tensor product topology.

For any such  and any  let 
 
where  defines a seminorm on  The family of seminorms  generates a topology making  into a locally convex space. The vector space  endowed with this topology will be denoted by  The special case where  is the scalar field will be denoted by 

There is a canonical embedding of vector spaces  defined by linearizing the bilinear map  defined by

Space of continuously differentiable vector-valued functions

Throughout, let  be an open subset of  where  is an integer and let  be a locally convex topological vector space (TVS).

 
where 

All of this work in extending the definition of differentiability and various topologies turns out to be exactly equivalent to simply taking the completed injective tensor product:

Spaces of continuous maps from a compact space

Spaces of sequences converging to 0

If  is a normed space, then let  denote the space of all sequences  in  that converge to the origin and give this space the norm  
Let  denote  
Then for any Banach space   is canonically isometrically isomorphic to

Schwartz space of functions

We will now generalize the Schwartz space to functions valued in a TVS. 

See also

Notes

References

Bibliography

External links

 Nuclear space at ncatlab

Functional analysis
Topological tensor products